HMAS Kybra was a support and training ship from World War II, serving with the Royal Australian Navy from 1940 to 1945. The name means "little ship" in Noongar.

Stateships 
Kybra was built in 1926 by Coaster Construction in Montrose, commissioned by the State Shipping Service of Western Australia. The crew consisted of 20 sailors. The gross register tonnage of the ship was 858 tons. She could take 34 passengers.

The vessel was launched on 13 January 1926, and sailed from Scotland to Australia where it arrived on 27 May. She was mainly used on the south coast of Western Australia.

In the 1930s the ship was required to be serviced in South Australia.

World War II 

In 1940 the RAN commandeered the vessel as HMAS Kybra (FY90), and she was given over to the command of Lieutenant Commander Basil T. Brewster. She served as an auxiliary patrol and anti-submarine training ship.

After the war she was returned to the State Shipping Service (on 10 November 1945) and was used on routes in the north west of Western Australia in the 1950s.

Kybra was scrapped at Kalibaru, Indonesia, in April 1968.

References

External links 
 
 

Royal Australian Navy ship names
World War II naval ships of Australia
Auxiliary ships of Australia
1926 ships